Colonel Durand (French: Le colonel Durand) is a 1948 French historical drama film directed by René Chanas and starring Paul Meurisse, Michèle Martin and Louis Seigner.

Cast
 Paul Meurisse as Le colonel d'empire Gérard Durand  
 Michèle Martin as Isabelle Patrizzi  
 Louis Seigner as Le commandant Millet  
 Robert Favart as Bertrand de Lormoy  
 Liliane Bert as Mme Hélié  
 Frédérique Nadar as Renée de Ponthiers  
 Rachel Devirys as Mme Nieburger  
 Albert Dinan as Raffart  
 Manuel Gary as Bontemps

References

Bibliography 
 Rège, Philippe. Encyclopedia of French Film Directors, Volume 1. Scarecrow Press, 2009.

External links 
 

1948 films
1940s French-language films
Films directed by René Chanas
French historical drama films
1940s historical drama films
Films set in the 19th century
Films based on French novels
French black-and-white films
1948 drama films
1940s French films